Narcissus hispanicus, the Spanish daffodil, or great daffodil, is a plant species native to France, Spain and Portugal. It is naturalized in the United Kingdom and cultivated elsewhere.

Also considered as a subspecies of Narcissus pseudonarcissus (N. pseudonarcissus ssp. major)

References

Bibliography

External links 

hispanicus
Flora of France
Garden plants
Flora of Spain
Flora of Portugal
Flora of Great Britain
Plants described in 1773
Taxa named by Antoine Gouan